Hystad Lake is a lake in Kandiyohi County, in the U.S. state of Minnesota. It was named for Andrew O. Hystad, a pioneer who settled there.

See also
List of lakes in Minnesota

References

Lakes of Minnesota
Lakes of Kandiyohi County, Minnesota